Georges Pootmans can refer to:

 Georges Pootmans (footballer) (1889-?), Belgian footballer.
 Georges Pootmans (ice hockey) (1917-?), Belgian ice hockey player